Edoardo (sive Edward) Magri (22 September 1908 – 14 October 1998) was a Maltese judge, author, and water polo player. He competed in the men's tournament at the 1928 Summer Olympics.

Career
Edoardo Magri participated in Malta’s Olympic debut in Water polo at the 1928 Summer Olympics in Amsterdam (these were his only Olympic Games). During this tournament, he played in two matches.

In the first round he played against the national team of Luxembourg (Malta's first game at the Olympics). The Maltese team won the match 3-1 and Magri was one of the goal scorers. The next two matches were lost by the Maltese team and they did not win any Olympic medals (0–16 against France and 0–10 against the United States respectively; Magri did not play in the match against France). This placed Malta at fifth place from a starting field of 14 teams.

Magri’s club affiliation was with his hometown team Sliema United that was later (1930) renamed Sliema A.S.C. Sliema Aquatic Sports Club is the most successful club on the island. As Sliema United, the club won its first Division 1 League in 1925 and again in 1929.

References

External links
 

1908 births
1998 deaths
Maltese male water polo players
Olympic water polo players of Malta
Water polo players at the 1928 Summer Olympics
Place of birth missing